WIFO may refer to:

WIFO (Nazi company), a former solid fuel research institute in Nazi Germany
WIFO-FM, a radio station
 or the Austrian Institute of Economic Research